is the ninth studio album by Japanese rock band Radwimps. Released on November 23, 2016 by EMI Records, it topped the Oricon charts in Japan and was certified platinum by the RIAJ.

Track listing

Personnel 
Credits are adapted from the album's liner notes.

 Yojiro Noda - lyrics (all tracks), music (all tracks)
 Kazuki Yamaguchi - director
 Masayoshi Sugai - recording (all tracks), mixing (1-4, 6-14)
 Tom Lord-Alge - mixing (track 5)
 Chris Lord-Alge - mixing (track 15)
 Bob Ludwig - mastering (all tracks)
 Tetsuya Nagato - art director, designer
 Model - Serena Motola
 Jamil Kazmi - mix coordination (track 5, 15)

References

2016 albums
Radwimps albums
EMI Records albums
Universal Music Group albums
Universal Music Japan albums